The Erzen is a river in central Albania.

Name
The ancient Illyrian name of the river was Ardaxanos, which is a derivative of *daksa "water", "sea", also found in the name of the island Daxa, of the Illyrian tribe Dassareti and of the Chaonian tribe Dexari. It is mentioned for the first time by Polybius in the 2nd century BC. The contemporary Albanian name Erzen (definite form: Erzeni) evolved from the ancient Ardaxanos through Albanian sound changes.

Overview
Significant tributaries of Erzen include Lake Farkë, Korrë, Lanë, Murdhar, Shtërmen and Zhëllimë.

The river passes through the city of Tirana, only a few kilometers from its southern end. Only a small range of hills separates the valley of the Erzen river with the Lana, Tirana, Zeza and Tërkuza rivers that form the Ishem river. On the southwestern outskirts at Yzberisht the transition from the plane to the Erzen valley is barely perceptible. The mouth is between Durres and the headland of Cape of Rodon at Lalzi bay. The average discharge rate at the mouth is 18.1 m³ / s, the highest discharge rate for the year exceeds minimum to the eleven-time. Its drainage area which includes all Tirana District and a part of Durres area is about 700 square km.

Apparently, all twenty-two victims of the 1951 massacre were dumped into the river on Enver Hoxha's orders, only to later be found wrapped tightly in barbed tape.

See also  
 
 Geography of Albania
 Rivers of Albania

References 

Rivers of Albania
Geography of Tirana County
Drainage basins of the Adriatic Sea
Dajti National Park
Braided rivers in Albania